Rho Draconis (ρ Draconis) is a solitary star in the northern circumpolar constellation of Draco. It is faintly visible to the naked eye with an apparent visual magnitude of 4.52. Based upon an annual parallax shift of 7.61 mas as measured from Earth, it is located around 429 light years from the Sun. At that distance, the visual magnitude of the star is diminished by an extinction factor of 0.027 due to interstellar dust.

With a stellar classification of K3 III, Rho Draconis is a normal giant star that is past the first dredge-up phase of its post-main sequence evolution. It has the peculiar spectrum of a CN star, showing abnormal line strengths for cyanogen and calcium. The star has expanded to around 28 times the Sun's radius and it is radiating 402 times the solar luminosity from its photosphere at an effective temperature of 4,370 K.

References

K-type giants
Draco (constellation)
Draconis, Rho
Durchmusterung objects
Draconis, 67
190940
098702
7685